New Longton and Hutton station was a railway station on the West Lancashire Railway in England. It was over a mile from each of the villages of Hutton and Howick Cross.

It was opened on 1 June 1889 as Howick just west of a level crossing at the junction of two streets which have been known as Chapel Lane and Station Road. It had two platforms. After the takeover of the West Lancashire Railway by the Lancashire & Yorkshire Railway on 1 July 1897 it was renamed Hutton and Howick on 1 December 1897. The station received a new signal box in 1901.

The coming of the railway attracted a settlement around the station which grew into the village of New Longton. The rapid growth of this village was the reason why the station was renamed New Longton and Hutton by the London and Midland Railway on 5 October 1934. Following the Beeching report, the station was closed to goods on 6 April 1964 and to passengers on 7 September 1964, together with the whole line. Around 1966 the tracks were lifted, and the buildings were pulled down soon after the station had been closed.

References 

Disused railway stations in South Ribble
Former Lancashire and Yorkshire Railway stations
Railway stations in Great Britain opened in 1889
Beeching closures in England
Railway stations in Great Britain closed in 1964